Derbyshire County Cricket Club in 1906 represents the cricket season when the English club Derbyshire had been playing for thirty five years. It was their twelfth season in the County Championship and they finished bottom of the table having won two matches in the County Championship.

1906 season

Derbyshire played 20 games in the County Championship, one match against the touring West Indians and one against MCC.

Levi Wright was in his first season as captain. Wright was top scorer, although Maynard Ashcroft had a better average and scored two centuries.  Billy Bestwick took most wickets with 111 .

Reginald Rickman, a future captain, made his debut and also Henry Purdy and Frederick Bracey who played several seasons. Thomas Hallam and Norman Todd appeared in 1906 and one more season each.

Matches

Statistics

County Championship batting averages

County Championship bowling averages

Wicket Keeper

J Humphries  Catches 61  Stumping 6

See also
Derbyshire County Cricket Club seasons
1906 English cricket season

References

1906 in English cricket
Derbyshire County Cricket Club seasons
English cricket seasons in the 20th century